This article is a list of King's and Queen's commissioners of the province of Friesland, Netherlands.

List of King's and Queen's commissioners of Friesland since 1945

References

Friesland